Sir Harold George Christie, CBE (30 May 1896 – 25 September 1973), known as H.G., was a Bahamian politician, realtor, developer and businessman. Christie is known as "The Father of Bahamas Real Estate".

Early life and real estate business 
Christie was born into poverty as the eldest of four children and a descendant of Loyalist Adam Christie. Christie was enlisted in the Royal Flying Corps in Canada during World War I. In 1922, he returned to the Bahamas to establish H.G. Christie Real Estate which began as a modest office, his brother Frank Homes Christie, CBE joined him in growing the company.

H.G Christie Real Estate is credited as the first real estate company to capitalise on the luxury market in the Bahamas and had a hand in almost all real estate developments in the country during his career, most notably Windermere Island in Eleuthera and Lyford Cay in New Providence.

Christie is also credited in attracting well known investors to the Bahamas including Guy Baxter, Arthur Vining Davis, Wallace Groves, E. P. Taylor, Lord Beaverbrook and many others.

Political career 
In 1927, Christie was elected as a representative for the Abaco District and in 1935 he became the representative for Cat Island; he served this district until he retired from politics in 1966.

Bahamas Airways Limited 
Christie and Sir Harry Oakes are credited with being the pioneers of commercial aviation in the Bahamas when they established Bahamas Airways Limited in 1936. Bahamas Airways was the first commercial airline in the Bahamas, growing the tourism and real estate sector. Flights allowed which was once a five-day journey by vessel to the Bahamas to just a ninety-minute flight. The company started with a twin-engined Douglas DOLPHIN amphibious aircraft and in a few years graduated to four-engined Locheed Constellation and Boeing Stratocruiser airliners that made trans Atlantic flights. Bahamas Airways Limited ceased operations in 1969.

Personal life 
In 1959, Christie was married for the first time at age 63 to Virginia Campbell Johnson. They had no biological children; Lady Christie had a son from a previous relationship.

Death 
Christie died on September 25, 1973, in Frankfurt, Germany, while on a business trip.

Legacy 
Christie was honoured with a CBE in 1949 and a knighthood in 1964.  Currently, H.G Christie Real Estate is the oldest and largest real estate company in The Bahamas.

References 

Real estate and property developers
Bahamian businesspeople
Bahamian politicians
20th-century businesspeople
Royal Flying Corps soldiers
People from Nassau, Bahamas
1896 births
1973 deaths
Royal Air Force officers
British Army personnel of World War I
Royal Air Force personnel of World War I